Albin J. Gurklis (March 16, 1918 – October 31, 2008) was a member of the Order of the Marians of the Immaculate Conception and a noted mathematics teacher at Marianapolis Preparatory School.

Early life
Albin J. Gurklis was born on March 16, 1918, to Dominick and Barbara Gurklis in a small home in Waterbury, Connecticut. When asked about his youth, Father Gurklis would reply that he "was small and not very good at math". Born into a Lithuanian family, he acquired his native tongue, speaking it along with American English.

College
Young Albin entered the novitiate and was ordained a priest at Marianapolis College, now Marianapolis Preparatory School on August 8, 1943. After being admitted to the order of the Marians of the Immaculate Conception, Father Gurklis completed his fourth year of theology at Marianapolis. He then proceeded to the Marian Hills Seminary in Clarendon Hills, Illinois, to complete his training. Father Gurklis, now with the title M.I.C., was admitted to Marquette University in Wisconsin to continue his studies in the area of mathematics attaining an M.S. in Mathematics in 1950 while completing a thesis paper on the Hexagramma Mysticum.

Marianapolis years
After a brief period of ministry at Marian parishes across the US, Father Gurklis returned to his alma mater Marianapolis to teach his favorite subject: mathematics. Father Gurklis, affectionately known as "Father Gurks" or simply "Gurks" was a familiar sight on Marianapolis campus for the next 58 years. He taught Algebra I, Algebra II, Pre-Calculus, Geometry, and Calculus, and even held the position of department chair for several years. During those 58 years he taught over 2000 students and worked to make Marianapolis an environment which promoted "clear, rational thinking". He also served as Assistant Headmaster at Marianapolis as well as dorm prefect and house secretary. Father Gurklis had the ability to teach with his eyes partially closed in order to "see" the answer to the problem and by his early 70s was able to recite his lesson plans from memory, with the inclusion of blackboard examples. In January 2008, he retired at the age of 90 due to eye complications, bidding a solemn farewell to his educational career. However, Father Gurklis did not leave without a farewell party, which celebrated his accomplishments.  During the ceremony, the faculty introduced the Father Gurklis Mathematics Award, intended to honor exemplary success in mathematics at Marianapolis.

Father Gurks was very proud of the achievements of his former students and certainly appreciated their visits after graduation.  When asked one time about how he could remember so many former students, he replied “I never forget a student!”.  Many Marinapolis graduates who have gone on to science and engineering careers credit Father Gurks with having given them the skills required to succeed in challenging college math courses.

Lithuanian community
Despite his work at Marianapolis, Father Gurklis was able to allocate time to the ministry of his fellow Lithuanians by celebrating masses in Lithuanian at the Holy Trinity Church in Hartford, Connecticut. In addition, he also assisted the Sisters of the Immaculate Conception in Putnam, Connecticut and provided ministry work to Lithuanian-American communities all throughout Connecticut.

Death
Father Gurklis suffered a massive heart attack on the night of October 30, 2008, and died a few hours later on the morning of Halloween. The following days saw a mass mourning at Marianapolis for the death of a beloved priest and teacher. Marians from all over the world came to pay their respects at Marianapolis and at Father Gurklis' funeral at the Eden Hill National Shrine of Divine Mercy. During the services Very Rev. Dan Cambra, MIC stated " we are dust, and unto dust we shall return " fulfilling Father Gurklis' belief that "it is what we do in life which makes us great". Father Gurklis is buried at the Marian cemetery in Stockbridge, Massachusetts.

Famous quotes

Father Gurklis possessed strong moral values and laws to which he lived his life by. This life-advice that he gave to his students became almost as important as the subject matter which he was teaching.

"English first! Then Mathematics!"
"Say what you mean! Mean what you say!"
"You wanna jump out the window? You wanna go to the second floor!? You study for a fifty and expect a HUNDRED!"
Alternatively, "You don't study for a test and pray to pass, it's like going up to the second floor, jumping out the window and praying for God to catch you."
 "Jump out the window and see if God saves you"
"One man's meat is another man's poison!"
"Smile – God loves you!"
"A chain is only as strong as its weakest link... and right now that's looking pretty weak!"
"Garbage In, Garbage Out"
"That's like going to Canada to go to Putnam!"
"Repetition is the mother of learning!"
"Thirty seconds is an eternity! How would you like to hang for thirty seconds?"
"The first 100 years are the hardest, then you're on easy street."

References

20th-century American mathematicians
21st-century American mathematicians
1918 births
2008 deaths
20th-century American Roman Catholic priests
American people of Lithuanian descent